"Call on Me" is a song written by Gary Scruggs, and recorded by American country music artist Tanya Tucker.  It was released in April 1989 as the third single from the album Strong Enough to Bend.  The song reached #4 on the Billboard Hot Country Singles & Tracks chart.

Charts

Weekly charts

Year-end charts

References

1989 singles
Tanya Tucker songs
Capitol Records Nashville singles
Song recordings produced by Jerry Crutchfield
1988 songs